Ramazan Njala Sports Palace is a multi-use sports arena in Durrës, Albania. It is the owned and operated by the Municipality of Durrës and it is the home of the multidisciplinary KS Teuta Durrës. It is named after former athlete Ramazan Njala, who played football, basketball, volleyball, handball and water polo as well as being an accomplished track and field athlete and swimmer.

References

Indoor arenas in Albania
Basketball venues in Albania
Sports venues in Albania
Indoor track and field venues
Buildings and structures in Durrës